Víctor Mancilla (1921–2011) was a Chilean footballer. He was first top scorer of Club Deportivo Universidad Católica in first tier tournaments.

Honours

Club
 Campeonato Nacional (Chile) Top-Scorer: 1943

References

Year of birth missing
Year of death missing
Chilean Primera División players
Club Deportivo Universidad Católica footballers
Association football forwards
Chilean footballers